Springfield Road station may refer to:
Springfield Road station (SEPTA Route 101), a SEPTA trolley station in Springfield, Pennsylvania
Springfield Road station (SEPTA Route 102), a SEPTA trolley station in Clifton Heights
Springfield Road station, a former police and British Army station on Springfield Road, Belfast

See also
Springfield Road (disambiguation)